Waddington is a populated place in Humboldt County, California, United States.

A post office operated at Waddington from 1891 to 1940. The name honors Alexander Waddington, a local merchant.

References

Former settlements in Humboldt County, California